Zoë Coombs Marr is an Australian comedian, performer and actor.

In 2014, Coombs Marr acted in Gideon Obarzanek’s L’Chaim which premiered as part of Sydney Dance Company's season Interplay.

In 2016 her show Trigger Warning, in which she adopts the persona of a sexist man called "Dave", received the Barry Award at the Melbourne International Comedy Festival (MICF). As well as the Barry (now known as Melbourne International Comedy Festival Award), the show also won two Green Room Awards.

Coombs Marr introduced her new character, "Bossy Bottom" at the Adelaide Fringe in March 2018, after she decided to leave "Dave" behind. She was nominated for the Helpmann Award for Best Comedy Performer for her new show. In April 2020, Amazon Prime started streaming a comedy special of "Bossy Bottom".

In 2022, Coombs Marr brought back the character of "Dave", who, as revealed in her new show, "The Opener", had been in a coma since 2016 and missed a lot of historic events such as the MeToo Movement, and the Black Lives Matter movement.

References

External links 

 Zoë Coombs Marr Homepage

Australian women comedians
Australian stage actresses
Living people
Australian LGBT actors
Year of birth missing (living people)

People from Grafton, New South Wales